State Highway 348 (SH 348) is a  state highway immediately southeast of Montrose and Delta counties in Colorado, United States that connects U.S. Route 50 (US 50) in Olathe US 50 in Delta.

Route description
The route begins at US 50 in the south part of Delta as Eaton Avenue as it begins westward. After crossing a railroad, the highway stops as Eaton Ave as it exits  Delta and enters farmland. It then continues southward through large rectangular fields until it meets D Road, where the route abruptly turns west. After an intersection with 25 Mesa Road, SH 348 continues on a southerly course, continuing to 5300 Road, where it abruptly turns right along Dalia Road. It then turns south and east abruptly before meeting US 50 Business a short distance before meeting US 50 in Olathe at its east end.

History
The route was established in 1939, when it began at SH 65 (now deleted) south of Delta and continued east through Olathe and looped northeastward back to US 50. In 1954, SH 348's routing was corrected to a route from US 50 in Delta to US 50 in Olathe, as it does now. The entire route was paved by the year 1963.

Major intersections

See also

 List of state highways in Colorado

References

External links

348
Transportation in Montrose County, Colorado